In professional boxing, the undisputed champion of a weight class is the boxer who holds world titles from all of the major sanctioning organisations simultaneously. There are currently four major sanctioning bodies: WBA, WBC, IBF and WBO. There were many undisputed champions before the number of major sanctioning bodies increased to four in 2007, but there have only been 13 boxers to hold all four titles simultaneously. As of January 2023, Canelo Álvarez, Jermell Charlo and Devin Haney are undisputed champions in the super middleweight, light middleweight and lightweight divisions respectively.

History
Prior to the 1960s, most champions were "undisputed", although the term was rarely used (it does not appear in one 1970 Boxing Dictionary). Early boxing champions at various weight divisions were established by acclamation between 1880 and 1920. Once a consensus champion had been awarded the title, the championship could usually be taken only by beating the reigning holder, establishing a lineal championship.

The New York State Athletic Commission (NYSAC) recognized champions from its foundation in 1920.  The National Boxing Association (NBA) was founded by other U.S. state bodies in 1921, and began recognising champions in 1927.  Until the 1960s, both usually recognised the same lineal champion. However, disputes could arise if the champion retired or moved to a different weight class.  Occasionally, the International Boxing Union (renamed the European Boxing Union in 1946) recognised a different champion.  The disputes were usually short-lived as a lucrative fight would be organised between the rival champions.  The longest split was ten years, of the middleweight title, between Mickey Walker's move up to heavyweight in 1931 and NBA champion Tony Zale's defeat of NYSAC contender Georgie Abrams in 1941. An early use of "undisputed" appears in a New York Times preview of the 1941 fight.

The growing popularity of boxing outside of the U.S. led to creation of various boxing organizations, each strengthening their influence (most notably BBBofC) and having their own champion. This resulted in a growing number of boxers claiming to be legitimate champions. The disruption in boxing was solved after World War II when the World Championship Committee (WCC) was created with NBA as its unanimous authority. The committee, however, was disbanded in 1955 when NBA, along with its new members (which included the Orient, Mexican and South American federations and boxing commissions of the Philippines and Thailand) left WCC citing lack of control over the organisation. The NBA's voting scheme guaranteed one vote for each state commission as well as one vote for each foreign country. On August 23, 1962, the NBA officially became the World Boxing Association and moved their headquarters to Panama City, Panama.

A year later NYSAC along with European Boxing Union and BBBofC supported creation of the World Boxing Council. WBC was officially established on February 14, 1963, in Mexico City, Mexico by 11 countries (the U.S., Argentina, U.K., France, Mexico, Philippines, Panama, Chile, Peru, Venezuela and Brazil) that were invited by the President of Mexico Adolfo López Mateos to form an international organization to unify all commissions of the world to control the expansion of boxing. The reason for the move were concerns about WBA's alleged lack of desire to support professional boxing outside of the U.S..

In April 1983, members of United States Boxing Association along with Robert W. Lee (a former WBA vice-president) voted to expand the organisation and form the USBA-International. The organization later changed the name to International Boxing Federation. The inaugural IBF heavyweight champion was Larry Holmes, who relinquished the WBC title to accept IBF's recognition, thus helping the newly formed organization to establish its legitimacy.  The fragmentation of titles was thus increased.  After some negotiations, the heavyweight title was unified in the heavyweight unification series, a series of coordinated bouts in 1986 and 1987, with Mike Tyson emerging as the first undisputed champion (WBA, WBC, and IBF) since Leon Spinks in 1978.  The title was split again in 1992 when Riddick Bowe forfeited the WBC title.

Another major sanctioning body, the World Boxing Organisation, was established in 1988 in San Juan, Puerto Rico by a group of local businessmen. At the beginnings, when most of the challengers for WBA, WBC, and IBF titles were Americans, WBO had a wider variety of countries, mainly European, represented in title bouts. Before the Klitschko Era, the United Kingdom tied the United States for most wins in WBO heavyweight title fights with eight. By 2001, the WBA was giving the same recognition to WBO champions as to WBA, WBC, and IBF champions. In 2004, the WBC began naming WBO champions on its ranking listings. The IBF did not recognise the WBO in May 2006, but was doing so by February 2007. Conversely, the WBO has been explicitly recognizing the other three sanctioning bodies since at least October 1, 2008.

Until at least 2008, many considered it sufficient to hold the WBA, WBC, and IBF titles. Other bodies such as the IBO, IBU, and World Boxing Foundation are disregarded.

Four title undisputed champions
Only 9 men have held all four versions of the belts at the same time.

 Bernard Hopkins unified all four middleweight titles in September 2004.
 Jermain Taylor won all four middleweight titles from Hopkins in July 2005.
 Terence Crawford unified all four light welterweight titles in August 2017.
 Oleksandr Usyk unified all four cruiserweight titles in the inaugural World Boxing Super Series tournament in July 2018.
 Josh Taylor unified all four light welterweight titles in May 2021.
 Canelo Álvarez unified all four super middleweight titles in November 2021.
 Jermell Charlo unified all four light middleweight titles in May 2022.
 Devin Haney unified all four lightweight titles in June 2022.
 Naoya Inoue unified all four bantamweight titles in December 2022.

There have been 8 women have held all four versions of the belts and been an undisputed world champion. One of which has been the only boxer, male or female, to have done so in two divisions. 
 Cecilia Brækhus unified all four welterweight titles in September 2014.
 Claressa Shields unified all four middleweight titles in April 2019.
 unified all four light middleweight titles in May 2021
 Katie Taylor unified all four lightweight titles in June 2019
 Jessica McCaskill won all four welterweight titles from Brækhus in August 2020.
 Franchón Crews-Dezurn unified all four super middleweight titles in April 2022
 Chantelle Cameron unified all four light welterweight titles in November 2022.
 Amanda Serrano won all four featherweight titles in February 2023
 Alycia Baumgardner won all four super featherweight titles in February 2023

As of February 2023, there have been 40 fights with all four belts on the line.

Disputed undisputed champions
If a fighter wins all the titles but is stripped by one organization of its title, he may continue to be considered the undisputed champion.

Roy Jones Jr. was called the undisputed light heavyweight champion after unifying the WBA, WBC, and IBF titles in June 1999. He was later awarded The Ring championship title. However, two of those titles (WBA and IBF) had been stripped from Dariusz Michalczewski, who had unified them with his WBO title by beating the lineal champion Virgil Hill in June 1997 and subsequently remained unbeaten, defending his remaining title, until his first loss in October 2003. Speaking of Jones' claim to being undisputed champion, one writer opined that the distinction "could just as easily belong to current WBO titleist Dariusz Michalczewski."

Five months after Lennox Lewis unified the WBA, WBC, and IBF titles to become the undisputed heavyweight champion, a U.S. Federal Judge ruled that Lewis would be stripped by the WBA of their world championship belt for fighting Michael Grant instead of the association's #1 contender, John Ruiz. The fight took place on April 29, 2000. Lewis remained a unified world champion until April 22, 2001, when he was defeated by Hasim Rahman. He regained the WBC and IBF titles following victory over Rahman seven months later in a rematch. His reign as a unified world champion ended in September 2002, when he rejected the chance to fight the IBF's #1 contender, Chris Byrd, and was therefore stripped by the organisation of their belt. He retained his WBC title until his retirement in February 2004.

Jermain Taylor won all four middleweight titles from Bernard Hopkins in July 2005, but was stripped of the IBF title for agreeing to a rematch rather than fighting Sam Soliman.  Nevertheless, he was still described as "undisputed champion" by some reports.

After Joe Calzaghe's super middleweight victory over Mikkel Kessler in November 2007, he was frequently described as "undisputed champion".  Others disputed this, because although he held the WBA, WBC, and WBO titles, he had vacated his IBF title in November 2006 for choosing to face Peter Manfredo Jr. as his next opponent instead of mandatory challenger Robert Stieglitz.

Teófimo López won the WBC Franchise lightweight title in addition to the WBA (Super), IBF, WBO and The Ring magazine titles after beating Vasiliy Lomachenko in October 2020, and was subsequently reported by some media outlets to be the youngest four-belt undisputed champion of all-time at the age of 23 years old; however, the WBC Franchise title is not universally recognized as a major world title.

Unified championship 
The unified champion is defined as a boxer that holds at least two world championships of major sanctioning bodies (WBA, WBC, IBF or WBO) in their respective division. Around 2004, the World Boxing Association recognized three different types: the unified champion (two-titles holder in the weight division or category, obliged to defend the title against WBA's No. 1 contender in 18 months periodically), the undisputed champion (three-titles holder, mandatory defense against WBA's challenger in 21 months regularly) and the super champion (four-titles holder, WBA's mandatory defense in 24 months periodically). The rules required only one unified/undisputed/super champion per weight class and the purse in the bid would be distributed in a 65/35 ratio in favor of the unified champion. However, along with the changes to "super" status (besides holding more than one title, the super titles were awarded to champions that were able to defend the WBA title 5 times), the term "undisputed" was dropped completely.

Current unified champions 

Keys:
 Undisputed championunifies all world titles from all four of the major sanctioning organisations

Most wins in unified championship bouts 

Keys:
 Active title reign
 Reign has ended

Most consecutive defenses of unified title 

Keys:
 Active title reign
 Reign has ended

Unification series

Tournaments have been arranged to unify the titles in a weight class.
 The HBO Heavyweight Boxing Series, held in 1986–88, crowned Mike Tyson as the undisputed heavyweight champion.
 World Boxing Super Series, held since 2017, produced Oleksandr Usyk as the undisputed cruiserweight champion.

Notes
1.

See also
 List of undisputed boxing champions
 List of female undisputed world boxing champions
 List of current world boxing champions
 Lineal championship

References

Boxing terminology
Boxing champions